Maarten Devoldere (born in 1988) is a Belgian singer-songwriter and music producer.

Devoldere began his career through his band Balthazar at age 22 with Applause (2010), the first album released by the band formed in 2004. In 2016, Maarten started Warhaus, a solo project.

Despite Balthazar being commonly referred to as an indie rock group, Devoldere has described their songs simply as pop music. The band had recorded three albums and one single, followed by a break, intending to come back and record a fourth album to be released in early 2018. As of March 2021, Sand is Balthazar's latest album.

Maarten's style in Warhaus has been described as a continuation of Leonard Cohen's style, although denser, with influences of Tom Waits' style and Serge Gainsbourg ballad songs. Some of Warhaus-period songs and albums were recorded with Devoldere's girlfriend at that time, Sylvie Kreusch, a Belgian musician who made her solo debut in 2018.

Discography 
 Balthazar
 Applause (2010)
 Rats (2012)
 Thin Walls (2015)
 Bunker (2015) - single
 The Break (La Trêve) Soundtrack (2016)
 Fever (2019)
 Sand (2021)

Warhaus
 We fucked a flame into being (2016)
 Warhaus (2017)
 Ha Ha Heartbreak (2022)

References

1988 births
Belgian musicians
Living people